Thomas Birch (1825 – 12 March 1880) was a 19th-century Member of Parliament in Dunedin, Otago, New Zealand.

He was the third Mayor of Dunedin.

References

1825 births
1880 deaths
Mayors of Dunedin
New Zealand MPs for Dunedin electorates
Members of the New Zealand House of Representatives
19th-century New Zealand politicians